Womanhunt is a 1962 American drama film directed by Maury Dexter and written by Russ Bender and Edward J. Lakso. The film stars Steven Piccaro, Lisa Lu, Berry Kroeger, Bob Okazaki, Ann Carroll, Tom Daly and Ivan Bonar. The film was released on June 3, 1962, by 20th Century Fox.

Plot

Cast 
Steven Piccaro as Hal Weston
Lisa Lu as Li Sheng
Berry Kroeger as Petrie / Osgood
Bob Okazaki as Dr. Sheng
Ann Carroll as Janet Oberon 
Tom Daly as Mr. Davalos
Ivan Bonar as Jacobs

Production
Womanhunt was an original story by Jesse Lasky Jr and Pat Silver.

The film was shot in and around Los Angeles.

References

External links 
 

1962 films
20th Century Fox films
American drama films
1962 drama films
Films directed by Maury Dexter
1960s English-language films
1960s American films